Hemalata or Hemalatha (హేమలత) may refer to:

Hemalatha, Kollywood actress
Hemalatha (Telugu actress), Tollywood actress
Hemalatha Lavanam (1932–2008), social reformer and writer
S. Hemalatha Devi, Indian politician

Indian feminine given names